The South American Beach Games is a biennial multi-sport event in beach sports between athletes representing nations from South America. It is organised by ODESUR (the South American Sports Organization). The first event was held in 2009.

Editions

Sports

Medals (2009 - 2019)

See also
African Beach Games
Asian Beach Games
Mediterranean Beach Games
World Beach Games

References

External links
ODESUR official website

 
Beach sports competitions
Beach
Multi-sport events in South America
Recurring sporting events established in 2009